Willie Bunn Jr. (born December 25, 1917) is an American former Negro league pitcher who played in the 1940s.

A native of Albany, Georgia, Bunn played for three teams in 1943: the Philadelphia Stars, the New York Black Yankees, and the Atlanta Black Crackers. In six recorded appearances on the mound, he posted a 7.50 ERA over 30 innings.

References

External links
 and Baseball-Reference Black Baseball Stats and Seamheads

1917 births
Year of death missing
Atlanta Black Crackers players
New York Black Yankees players
Philadelphia Stars players
Baseball pitchers
Baseball players from Georgia (U.S. state)
Sportspeople from Albany, Georgia